Xu Dexin (born 2 November 1985), former name Xu De'en, is a Chinese football player.

Club career
Xu Dexin rose to prominence in 2005 for Guangzhou F.C. where he was praised for his speed and ability. During his time with Guangzhou he has seen them fight for promotion, eventually achieving this the 2007 season where they won the second tier league title. Since Guangzhou were promoted to the Chinese Super League Xu De'en has often found himself playing predominantly as a substitute. Xu move to China League One side Hunan Billows on a free transfer in February 2011. He was released from the team at the end of 2011 season due to severe injury.

Club career statistics

Statistics accurate as of match played 30 October 2016

Honours
Guangzhou F.C.
China League One: 2007, 2010

References

External links
 Biography at sina.com website
 Biography at sports.cn website
 Player profile at Guangzhou Pharmaceutical website

1987 births
Living people
Chinese footballers
Footballers from Guangzhou
Guangzhou F.C. players
Hunan Billows players
Chinese Super League players
China League One players
Association football midfielders
21st-century Chinese people